The Organization is a British television drama series, produced by Yorkshire Television for the ITV network in 1972.

The series, written by Philip Mackie, was set in the offices of the fictional Greatrick Organization, a faceless multi-million pound corporation dedicated solely to profits and more profits.

Peter Egan starred as new junior executive Richard Pershore, struggling to navigate his way through the corporate minefield, surrounded by  more experienced and ambitious players. Through the course of seven episodes, The Organization features all the executive members of the public relations team at Greatrick.

Cast

 Peter Egan as Richard Pershore
 Anton Rodgers as Peter Frame
 Donald Sinden as David Pulman
 Bernard Hepton as Rodney Spurling
 Elaine Taylor as Veronica
 Jill Melford as Eve Manship
 Norman Bird as Ken Grist

Episodes

All seven episodes were written by Philip Mackie.

Home media
The Organization is available on DVD in the UK.

References

External links
 

1970s British drama television series
ITV television dramas
1972 British television series debuts
1972 British television series endings
Television series by Yorkshire Television
English-language television shows